Jeffrey Dee McCurry (born January 21, 1970) is an American former professional baseball pitcher. He appeared in parts of five seasons at the Major League Baseball (MLB) for the Pittsburgh Pirates, Detroit Tigers, Colorado Rockies, and Houston Astros.

Playing career
McCurry was drafted by the Pirates in the 14th round of the 1990 MLB draft. He did not sign a contract with Pittsburgh until May 25, 1991. He made his professional debut with their Rookie league Gulf Coast Pirates and Class A (Short Season) Welland Pirates in 1991. McCurry recorded a 2.57 ERA in 6 games with the GCL Pirates and an 0.57 ERA in 9 appearances with Welland.

McCurry split the 1992 season between the Class A Augusta Pirates and the Class A-Advanced Salem Buccaneers. He recorded a 3.30 ERA in 19 outings with Augusta. In 30 games with Salem, he recorded a 6–2 record and an earned run average of 2.87 over 62.2 innings. In 1993, McCurry made 41 appearances for Salem and tallied a 1–4 record and a 3.89 ERA. He also appeared in 23 games for the Class AA Carolina Mudcats, recording a 2.79 ERA in 29 innings. He spent the entire 1994 season with Carolina. Appearing in 48 games, McCurry totaled a 6–5 record and a 3.21 ERA in 81.1 innings.

Post–playing career
McCurry now coaches baseball at St. Thomas High School in Houston, Texas.

See also
 List of Major League Baseball players from Japan

References

External links

1970 births
Living people
American baseball coaches
American expatriate baseball players in Canada
American expatriates in Japan
Augusta Pirates players
Calgary Cannons players
Carolina Mudcats players
Colorado Rockies players
Colorado Springs Sky Sox players
Detroit Tigers players
High school baseball coaches in the United States
Houston Astros players
Major League Baseball pitchers
Major League Baseball players from Japan
Nashville Sounds players
New Orleans Zephyrs players
Pittsburgh Pirates players
Salem Buccaneers players
San Jacinto Central Ravens baseball players
Sportspeople from Tokyo
TCU Horned Frogs baseball players
Toledo Mud Hens players
Welland Pirates players